Pir Ali or Pirali may refer to:

Persons
 Pir Ali (Yazidi saint)

Places
 Pir Ali, Ardabil
 Pir Ali, Chaharmahal and Bakhtiari
 Pirali, Fars
 Pir Ali, Khuzestan
 Pir Ali, North Khorasan
 Pirali, West Azerbaijan
 Pirali, Horasan

See also
 Böyük Pirəli
 Ali Pir